This is a list of countries by total number of peacekeepers contributed to United Nations operations based on United Nations reporting as of 30 September 2021.

List

Notes

See also
List of countries by number of military and paramilitary personnel

References

United Nations peacekeeping
UN peacekeepers